Littleton High School is the name of several high schools in the United States:
Littleton High School (Colorado), Littleton, Colorado
Littleton High School (Massachusetts), Littleton, Massachusetts
Littleton High School (New Hampshire), Littleton, New Hampshire